Marcel Granollers and Sergiy Stakhovsky were the reigning champions from when the tournament was last held in 2019, but chose not to defend their title.

William Blumberg and Jack Sock won the title, defeating Austin Krajicek and Vasek Pospisil in the final, 6–2, 7–6(7–3).

Seeds

Draw

Draw

References

External links
 Main Draw

2021,Doubles
2021 ATP Tour